Salémata Department  is one of the 45 departments of Senegal, located in the Kédougou Region. It was created as part of the new region in 2008.

The chief settlement and only commune in the department is Salémata.

The rural districts (Communautés rurales) comprise:
 Arrondissement of Dakateli:
 Dakateli
 Kévoye (previously Thiankoye)
Arrondissement of Dar Salam
 Dar Salam
 Ethiolo
 Oubadji

References

Departments of Senegal
Kédougou Region